

p
P.A.S. Sodium

pa

pac-pal
Pacerone (Upsher-Smith Laboratories)
paclitaxel (INN)
pacrinolol (INN)
padimate A (INN)
padimate O (INN)
padoporfin (INN)
pafenolol (INN)
paflufocon D-hem-iberfilcon A (USAN)
pafuramidine maleate (USAN)
pagibaximab (INN)
Pagitane (Eli Lilly and Company)
pagoclone (INN)
paguinal hydrochloride (USAN)
palatrigine (INN)
paldimycin (INN)
palifermin (USAN)
palifosfamide (USAN)
palinavir (INN)
palindore fumarate (USAN)
paliperidone (USAN)
paliroden (INN)
palivizumab (INN)
palmidrol (INN)
palmoxiric acid (INN)
palonidipine (INN)
palonosetron (INN)
palovarotene (USAN)

pam
pamapimod (USAN)
pamaqueside (INN)
pamaquine (INN)
pamatolol (INN)
Pamelor (Mallinckrodt)
pamicogrel (INN)
pamidronic acid (INN)
Pamine (Fougera)
pamiteplase (INN)

pan-pap
panadiplon (INN)
panamesine (INN)
pancopride (INN)
pancuronium bromide (INN)
Pandel
Panheprin
panidazole (INN)
panipenem (INN)
panitumumab (INN)
Panixine Disperdose
Panmycin
panomifene (INN)
Panorex
Panretin
Panretin (Ligand Pharmaceuticals)
pantenicate (INN)
panthenol (INN)
Pantopaque
pantoprazole (INN)
panuramine (INN)
Panwarfin
Papa-Deine
papaveroline (INN)

par

para-parc
Paracaine
paracetamol (INN)
Paracort
Paradione
Paraflex
paraflutizide (INN)
Parahexal (Hexal Australia) [Au]. Redirects to paracetamol.
paramethadione (INN)
paramethasone (INN)
parapenzolate bromide (INN)
Paraplatin
Paraplatin (Bristol-Myers Squibb)
parapropamol (INN)
pararosaniline embonate (INN)
Parasal
Parathar
parathiazine (INN)
parathyroid hormone (INN)
paraxazone (INN)
parbendazole (INN)
parcetasal (INN)
parconazole (INN)

pare-parv
Paredrine
Paremyd
pareptide (INN)
parethoxycaine (INN)
pardoprunox (USAN)
pargeverine (INN)
pargolol (INN)
pargyline (INN)
paricalcitol (INN)
paridocaine (INN)
Parlodel
parnaparin (INN)
Parnate
parodilol (INN)
paromomycin (INN)
paroxetine (INN)
paroxypropione (INN)
parsalmide (INN)
Parsidol
partricin (INN)
parvaquone (INN)

pas-paz
pascolizumab (INN)
Paser
pasiniazid (INN)
pasireotide (INN)
Pascalium (Pharmathen)
patamostat (INN)
Patanol (Novartis)
Pathilon
Pathocil
paulomycin (INN)
Pavulon
paxamate (INN)
Paxene (Baker Norton Pharmaceuticals, Inc)
Paxil (GlaxoSmithKline)
Paxipam
patupilone (INN)
pazelliptine (INN)
pazinaclone (INN)
pazopanib hydrochloride (USAN)
pazoxide (INN)
pazufloxacin (INN)